The Lüshi Chunqiu, also known in English as Master Lü's Spring and Autumn Annals, is an encyclopedic Chinese classic text compiled around 239 BC under the patronage of the Qin Dynasty Chancellor Lü Buwei. In the evaluation of Michael Carson and Michael Loewe, "The Lü shih ch'un ch'iu is unique among early works in that it is well organized and comprehensive, containing extensive passages on such subjects as music and agriculture, which are unknown elsewhere. It is also one of the longest of the early texts, extending to something over 100,000 words.

Background
The Shiji (chap. 85, p. 2510) biography of Lü Buwei has the earliest information about the Lüshi Chunqiu. Lü was a successful merchant from Handan who befriended King Zhuangxiang of Qin. The king's son Zheng, who the Shiji suggests was actually Lü's son, eventually became the first emperor Qin Shi Huang in 221 BC. When Zhuangxiang died in 247 BC, Lü Buwei was made regent for the 13-year-old Zheng. In order to establish Qin as the intellectual center of China, Lü "recruited scholars, treating them generously so that his retainers came to number three thousand" (tr. Knoblock and Riegel 2000:13). In 239 BC, he, in the words of the Shiji

According to Shiji, Lü exhibited the completed encyclopedic text at the city gate of Xianyang, capital of Qin, and above it was a notice offering a thousand measures of gold to any traveling scholar who could add or subtract even a single word.

The Hanshu Yiwenzhi lists the Lüshi Chunqiu as belonging to the Zajia (雜家/杂家 "Mixed School"), within the Philosophers' domain (諸子略), or Hundred Schools of Thought. Although this text is frequently characterized as "syncretic," "eclectic", or "miscellaneous", it was a cohesive summary of contemporary philosophical thought, including Legalism, Confucianism, Mohism, and Daoism.

Contents
The title uses chunqiu (春秋 lit. "spring and autumn") meaning "annals; chronicle" in a classical reference to the Confucianist chunqiu Spring and Autumn Annals, which chronicles the State of Lu history from 722–481 BC.

The Lüshi Chunqiu text comprises 26 juan (卷 "scrolls; books") in 160 pian (篇 "sections"), and is divided into three major parts; the Ji (紀, "The Almanacs"): Books 1-12 correspond to the months of the year, and list appropriate seasonal activities to ensure that the state runs smoothly. This part, which was copied as the Liji chapter Yueling, takes many passages from other texts, often without attribution. The Lan (覧, "The Examinations"): Books 13–20 each have 8 sections. This is the longest and most eclectic part, giving quotations from many early texts, some no longer extant. The Lun (論, "The Discourses"): Books 21–26 mostly deal with rulership, excepting the final four sections about agriculture. This part resembles the Lan in composition.

Integrity of the text
Composition features, measure of completeness (i.e. veracity of the Shi ji account) and/or possible corruption of the original Annals have been subjects of scholarly attention. It has been mentioned that the Almanacs have much higher measure of integrity and thematic organization than the other two parts of the text.

The "Yu da" 諭大 chapter of the Examinations, for example, contains text almost identical to the "Wu da" 務大 chapter of the Discourses, though in the first case it is ascribed to "Jizi" 季子, and in the second to Confucius.

Reception
Liang Qichao (1873-1929): "This book, through the course of two thousand years, has had no deletions nor corruptions. Moreover, it has the excellent commentary of Gao You. Truly it is the most perfect and easily read work among the ancient books."

Liang's position, mildly criticized afterwards, was dictated by the lack of canonical status ascribed to the book.

1000 taels for a correction

Records of the Grand Historian told that after Lü Buwei presented the finished Lüshi Chunqiu for the public at the gate of Xianyang (Qin's capital) and announced that anyone could correct the book's content would be awarded 1000 taels of gold for every corrected word. This event lead to the Chinese idiom "One word worths thousand golds." (一字千金)

None of the contemporary scholars pointed out any mistakes in the Lüshi Chunqiu, although later scholars managed to detected a number of them. It is believed that although Lü Buwei's contemporaries were able to detect the book's inaccuracies, but none dare to openly criticize a powerful figure like Lü.

Major positions
Admitting the difficulties of summarizing the Lüshi Chunqiu, John Knoblock and Jeffrey Riegel list 18 major points.
Affirmation of self-cultivation and impartiality
Rejection of hereditary ruler over the empire
Stupidity as the cause of hereditary rule
Need for government to honor the concerns of the people
The central importance of learning and teachers
Support and admiration for learning as the basis of rule
Non-assertion on the part of the ruler
Primary task for a ruler is to select his ministers
Need for a ruler to trust the expertise of his advisers
Need for a ruler to practice quiescence
The attack on Qin practices
Just warfare
Respect for civil arts
Emphasis on agriculture
Facilitating trade and commerce
Encouraging economy and conservation
Lightening of taxes and duties
Emphasis on filial piety and loyalty. (2000:46–54)
The Lüshi chunqiu is an invaluable compendium of early Chinese thought and civilization.

Popular culture
In the Japanese manga Kingdom, the annals were created by Lü himself, and using his own coffers he hired several intellectuals, philosophers, and other people to formulate them. After the annals' release, he challenged others to add to or edit them in exchange for rewards.

References
Footnotes

Works cited

Knoblock, John and Jeffrey Riegel. 2000. The Annals of Lü Buwei: A Complete Translation and Study. Stanford: Stanford University Press. 
Sellmann, James D. 2002. Timing and Rulership in Master Lü's Spring and Autumn Annals (Lüshi chunqiu). Albany: State University of New York Press.

External links
呂氏春秋, complete text in Chinese
Lüshi chunqiu 呂氏春秋, ChinaKnowledge entry

Chinese classic texts
Chinese chronicles
Zhou dynasty texts
3rd-century BC history books
Chinese encyclopedias
Leishu